The article contains a list of different forms of solid waste treatment technologies and facilities employed in waste management infrastructure.

Waste handling facilities
Civic amenity site (CA site)
Transfer station

Established waste treatment technologies
Incineration
Landfill
Recycling

Specific to organic waste:
Anaerobic digestion
Composting
Windrow composting

Alternative waste treatment technologies
In the UK some of these are sometimes termed advanced waste treatment technologies
Biodrying
Gasification
 Plasma gasification: Gasification assisted by plasma torches
Hydrothermal carbonization
Hydrothermal liquefaction
Mechanical biological treatment (sorting into selected fractions)
Refuse-derived fuel
Mechanical heat treatment
Molten salt oxidation
Pyrolysis
UASB (applied to solid wastes)
Waste autoclave

 Specific to organic waste:
Bioconversion of biomass to mixed alcohol fuels
In-vessel composting
Landfarming
Sewage treatment
Tunnel composting

See also
Bioethanol
Biodiesel
List of waste management companies
List of wastewater treatment technologies
Pollution control
Waste-to-energy
Burn pit

Anaerobic digestion
Thermal treatment
Waste treatment technology
Solid waste treatment technologies